The University of Malaya (abbreviated as UM or informally the Malayan University) is a public research university located in Kuala Lumpur, Malaysia. It is the oldest and highest ranking Malaysian institution of higher education according to two international ranking agencies, and also the only university in the post-independent Malaya. The university has graduated five prime ministers of Malaysia, and other political, business, and cultural figures of national prominence.

The predecessor of the university, King Edward VII College of Medicine, was established on 28 September 1905 in Singapore, then a territory of the British Empire. In October 1949, the merger of the King Edward VII College of Medicine and Raffles College created the university. Rapid growth during its first decade caused the university to organize as two autonomous divisions on 15 January 1959, one located in Singapore and the other in Kuala Lumpur. In 1960, the government of Malaysia indicated that these two divisions should become autonomous and separate national universities. One branch was located in Singapore, later becoming the National University of Singapore after the independence of Singapore from Malaysia, and the other branch was located in Kuala Lumpur, retaining the name University of Malaya. Legislation was passed in 1961 and the University of Malaya was established on 1 January 1962. In 2012, UM was granted autonomy by the Ministry of Higher Education.

Today, UM has more than 2,300 faculty members and is divided into thirteen faculties, two academies, five institutes and six academic centres. In the latest QS World University Rankings, UM is currently ranked 70th in the world, 8th in Asia, 3rd in Southeast Asia and the highest ranked learning institution in Malaysia.

The Faculty of Languages and Linguistics, Japanese Language and Linguistic Course was awarded the Japanese Foreign Minister’s Commendation for their contributions to promotion of Japanese language education in Malaysia on 1 December 2020. The University of Malaya also has its own radio station, UMalaya Radio which is under the auspices of its Student & Alumni Affairs Division.

History

King Edward VII College of Medicine

The establishment of the university began with the issue of shortage of medical assistants in Singapore and Penang during the late 1890s. The problem was addressed in a report published by the Education Commission in April 1902. In the report, it was stated that the commission was in favour of establishing a medical school to fulfil the demand for medical assistants in government hospitals. However, such a view was not in favour among the European community.

Legislation was passed by the Straits Legislative Council in June 1905 under Ordinance No. XV 1905. The school opened on 3 July 1905 and began functioning in September. On 28 September 1905, Sir John officiated the school under the name ‘The Straits and Federated Malay States Government Medical School.’

The school was located in the old Female Lunatic Asylum near the Singapore General Hospital at Sepoy Lines off New Bridge Road, where four of the asylum buildings were converted into a medical school. In 1907, a lecture hall and laboratory were added. There were no library and room to keep pathological specimens.

In 1905, there were 17 medical students, four students attending the hospital assistant course. Five years later, the enrolments increased to 90 medical students and 30 trainee hospital assistants. The school had only one permanent staff which was the Principal, the teaching staff were employed on a part-time basis. The Principal was Dr Gerald Dudley Freer, who previously served as Senior Colonial Surgeon Resident of Penang.

The School Council wanted to gain recognition of its Diploma by the General Council of Medical Education in the United Kingdom to ensure that the Licentiate of Medicine and Surgery Diploma offered by the school would gain worldwide recognition. In 1916, the GCME recognised the Licentiate of Medicine and Surgery Diploma offered by the school. The licentiates were placed on the General Council's Colonial List of the British Medical Register and were entitled to practise anywhere within the British Empire.

In 1910, Dr Robert Donald Keith became the second Principal of the School. The first two years of the five-year course were devoted to pure science studies. Physics, biology and chemistry were taught in the first year, followed by physiology and elementary anatomy in the second year. The remaining three years were attachment to clinical clerkships in medicine, surgery and midwifery, which covered pathology, hygiene and medical jurisprudence. Materia Medica was integrated into the fourth year, where practical pharmacy was taught.

Students were posted to several hospitals, initially at the Singapore General Hospital. From 1908 onwards, attachments were made to Tan Tock Seng Hospital (for medicine and surgery) and Kandang Kerbau Maternity Hospital (for midwifery).

In 1912, the medical school received an endowment of $120,000 from the King Edward VII Memorial Fund, started by Dr Lim Boon Keng. Subsequently, on 18 November 1913, the name of the school was changed to the King Edward VII School of Medicine.

In the first batch of 16 students of 1905, only seven made to the final and graduated in May 1910 while the remaining six students graduated in four months later and others resigned from the school. In 1919, the drop-out rate had risen to 35%, while in 1939 the number of students failed in their final examinations stood at 44%.

At this time a hostel was built to accommodate 72 male students from the Federated Malay States.

In 1921, the school was elevated in status to college. Between 1920 and 1930, the college went through a series of transformations, by replacing the old teaching staff with a younger generation of professionals and also nine new Chairs were created, the first in Anatomy in 1920, followed by Medicine, Surgery, and Midwifery & Gynaecology in 1922 and Clinical Surgery, Bacteriology, Biology, Bio-Chemistry, and Dental Surgery in 1926. And the tenth chair for Pathology was created in 1935.

In 1923, the college's new building at Outram Road was commenced. It was completed in November 1925 and officially opened by Sir Laurence Guillemard in February 1926. During the opening ceremony, the college conferred Honorary Diplomas on Sir David James Galloway, Dr Malcolm Watson and Dr Lim Boon Keng.

In 1929, Dr George V. Allen the new principal took the helm, succeeding his predecessor Dr MacAlister.

Raffles College
The establishment of Raffles College was a brainchild of Sir Stamford Raffles and Dr Robert Morison. Sir Stamford had some knowledge of the Malay language and culture, while Morison was a distinguished sinologist missionary. Both men wanted to establish a centre dedicating to the study of Malays and Chinese at tertiary level.

On 5 June 1823, a site designated for an education institution had its foundation stone laid by Sir Stamford. Soon after that, Raffles left for England and Morrison left for China, thus the establishment of the school never happened. The school building was revived as an English school named the Raffles Institution.

In 1918, Sir William George Maxwell, the Colonial Secretary of the Straits Settlements chaired the Maxwell Committee to review the scheme to commemorate the centenary of the founding of Singapore by Sir Stamford. The committee members were Roland Braddell, A.W. Still, Seah Ling Seah, Dr Lim Boon Keng, Mohammed Yusoff bin Mohammed, N.V. Samy, and Mannesseh Meyer.  The working committee headed by H.W. Firmstone recommended the establishment of a college for tertiary education to commemorate the centenary founding of Singapore. On 12 July 1919, the Government decided to undertake the construction of the building with the cost not more than $1,000,000 and would contribute $50,000 as annual recurrent expenditure as soon as the Centenary Committee had collected $2,000,000 for the Raffles College Endowment Fund. On 31 August 1920, the committee had achieved the figure, amounting to $2,391,040. On 31 May 1920, Richard Olaf Winstedt was appointed as the Acting Principal of Raffles College. The course offered was a three-year basis. The establishment of the school was seen far more systematic compared to the King Edward VII Medical College. The school was situated at a site called the Economic Gardens and was designed by Cyril Farey and Graham Dawbarn. And the construction took place in 1926.

Following completion of the first hostel, Raffles College was opened informally to students on 12 June 1928. Of the first 43 students, nine were private students, and the rest were government-funded; there were two women among this first cohort. On 22 July 1929, Raffles College was formally established. Its students studied either arts or sciences, and graduated with a diploma after three years. Science students were permitted to use the labs of the King Edward VII College. Four years later, the College Council proposed changes in the curriculum, so that the Diploma could be furthered to a Degree through external examinations in collaboration with universities in England.

In 1937, Sir Shenton Thomas declared the college would have a full-time Principal. The college had its fourth Principal, Alexander Keir, succeeding Frederick Joseph Morten. By 1939 war was waged in Europe, and had put a halt to the development of the college. The war in Europe came to Asia and Singapore was invaded by the Japanese in February 1942.

After the war, the school was reopened and W.E. Dyer was Principal. The future of Raffles College was uncertain, until 1948 when Dr George V. Allen (later Sir) who was formerly the Principal of King Edward VII Medical College posted as the last Principal of Raffles College. The college was amalgamated with the former, for the making of a university for the Malayans.

University of Malaya (1949–1962)

In 1938, the government appointed a commission under the chairmanship of Sir William McLean to study the higher education potential and progress in Malaya. The Commission concluded that Malaya was not ready to have a university, and that a university college would be more suitable.

In 1943, Oliver Stanley, the Secretary of State for the Colonies, appointed a commission of inquiry chaired by Cyril Asquith to consider the development of higher education in the colonies across the British Empire. The Asquith Commission, reporting in 1945, endorsed the McLean Commission's recommendations for Malaya.

In 1946, Raymond Priestley, the Vice-Chancellor of Birmingham University and member of the previous Asquith Commission, was invited by the British Malaya Government to visit and discuss the application of the Asquith Commission's recommendations to Singapore and Malaya. Priestley again recommended the establishment of a university college as a first step.

In January 1947, the Secretary of State for the Colonies, now Arthur Creech Jones, appointed Sir Alexander Carr-Saunders to chair a commission determining the details of establishing a university college in Malaya. In March of the same year, the other members of the commission were announced and George Allen, principal of King George VII College, was appointed principal-designate of the planned university college. Carr-Saunders listened to the thoughts of the alumni association and students' union of King Edward VII College; he was impressed with the ideas of the president of the students' union, Kanagaratnam Shanmugaratnam. In 1948, the Carr-Saunders Commission recommended the immediate establishment of a full university, bypassing the intermediate step of a university college recommended by previous commissions.

As a result, the institution named the University of Malaya was chartered under the Carr-Saunders Commission in 1949. The formation of the University of Malaya on 8 October 1949 in Singapore came from the merger of King Edward VII College of Medicine and Raffles College, which had been established in 1905 and 1929, respectively.

In Carr-Saunders Commission's report in 1949, it was stated that "the university shall act as a single medium of mingle for enhancing the understanding among the multi-ethnics and religions in the back than Malaya. The University too should be modelled after the tertiary educations in the United Kingdom of Great Britain in term of academic system and administration structure".

The Carr-Saunders Commission postulates "the principle that all children who show the necessary capacity should enjoy an equal chance of reaching the University; and, in particular, that no able child should be handicapped in climbing the educational ladder by race, religion, rural domicile, or lack of means."

In 1959, the university was divided into two autonomous campuses, one in Singapore and the other in Kuala Lumpur.

University of Malaya (re-established 1962)

In 1961, the governments of Malaysia and Singapore passed laws to split the University of Malaya into two national universities. As a result, on 1 January 1962, the University of Malaya was re-established on the 309 hectare campus in Kuala Lumpur, retaining its original name and became the only university in the post-independent Malaya. The campus in Singapore became the University of Singapore (today the National University of Singapore).

On 16 June 1962, the newly independent university in Kuala Lumpur celebrated the installation of its first Chancellor, Tunku Abdul Rahman, Malaysia's first Prime Minister. The first Vice-Chancellor was former Dean of Arts, Sir Alexander Oppenheim, the mathematician who formulated the Oppenheim conjecture in 1929. When Oppenheim left in 1965 with no successor in sight, Rayson Huang who later went on to become the first Asian Vice-Chancellor of the University of Hong Kong, was asked to take over as the Acting Vice-Chancellor. He served in that capacity for 12 months but declined reappointment to return to academic pursuits.

Chin Fung Kee, an authority in geotechnical engineering, replaced Huang as Acting Vice-Chancellor until the university filling the position in 1967 by the appointment of James H.E. Griffiths. A distinguished physicist and a fellow of Magdalen College, Oxford, Griffiths was also the former head of Clarendon Laboratory of Oxford University and one of the discoverers of ferromagnetic resonance.

Coat of arms

The University of Malaya's coat of arms was designed under a council established in 1961, chaired by Tan Sri Y.C. Foo. The members of the committee involved in the design were the chairman of the council, Y.C. Foo, Professor A. Oppenheim (the vice-chancellor) and Professor Ungku Aziz (later regius professor). The coat of arms was officially chartered in April 1962 by Tunku Abdul Rahman, the university's first chancellor.

The coat of arms is divided into two parts, namely the chief (upper part) and the base (the remainder). The chief is a bundle of seventeen strips of the leaves of Borassus flabellifer or the Palmrya palm. These strips were used as printed material for ancient books by the Malays, long before paper was invented. On the centre of these seventeen strips is the university's motto ‘Ilmu Puncha Kemajuan’. The motto consists of ‘Ilmu’ derived from Arabic, ‘Puncha’ from Sanskrit, and ‘Kemajuan’ from Malay. These words mean knowledge is the source of progress.

In the centre of the arms is a hibiscus rosa-sinensis species encircled by three Malayan tigers. The tigers symbolise the three main races in Malaysia (Malays, Chinese and Indians), who work hand-in-hand to protect the nation and uphold the duty to serve the country.

It is blazoned: 

Since the late 1990s, the UM coat of arms was accompanied by the university's wordmark which is written in capital letters - 'UNIVERSITI MALAYA' or 'UNIVERSITY OF MALAYA' as seen on its corporate logo. This makes UM the only university in Malaysia to have a different language versions of its logo.

Academic profile

University of Malaya has been ranked consistently as the No. 1 university in Malaysia and among the top 3 universities in Southeast Asia, as well as among the top 400 universities in the world according to reputed ranking publisher such as QS, ARWU, U.S. News & World Report in the recent few years.

In 2015 it has been ranked 54th in Engineering & Technology in QS world ranking. UM rose to the top 100 universities in the QS World University Rankings 2019, and has consistently increased in ranking to 59th in the world and 9th in Asia in the 2021 series. In 2021, U.S. News & World Report ranked University of Malaya 17th and 87th in the world in Engineering and Computer Science respectively by its subject ranking.

The business school of this university achieved two international accreditations i.e. Association to Advance Collegiate Schools of Business (AACSB) and Association of MBAs (AMBA).

Transportation access

The University of Malaya campus is accessible by car, bus, and both the LRT Kelana Jaya Line (Line 5), MRT Kajang Line (Line 9) and KTM Port Klang Line (Line 2) of the Klang Valley Integrated Transit System. Although walkable, the campus is large enough to make walking uncomfortable. As UM is situated within Kuala Lumpur, high daily temperatures and humidity may be experienced by students and staff. Individuals with disabilities may have difficulty due to limited crosswalks and a lack of sidewalks on some roads.

The campus can be accessed by alighting from  Universiti on LRT Kelana Jaya Line, with a 15-minute walk to the Kuala Lumpur (KL) entrance.  Angkasapuri station on the Port Klang Komuter Line or  Phileo Damansara MRT station are the other two nearest stations. The former has a connection to the GoKL Pink Line bus service, where the bus stops at the nearby mosque, which is about a 5 to 10-minute walk from the KL entrance. The latter is 3 km from the campus' Petaling Jaya (PJ) main entrance, supplemented by T815 MRT Feeder Bus service. Several bus routes operated by RapidKL include T815 and T789, both of which connect to Phileo Damansara and Universiti stations respectively. PJ City Bus free ride service also has a stop in University Malaya Medical Centre (PPUM) and can be accessed from the PJ gate. Other rapidKL bus services may stop at PPUM.

Signage showing the direction of buildings and other sites appear frequently next to the campus roadways.

The university also provides complimentary shuttle bus services during weekdays for students with 5 different routes, named AB, BA, C, D and E. Certain routes serve areas within the campus, others connect external accommodation or buildings with the main campus area.

Organisation and Administration

Faculties, Academies, Institutes & Centres

Faculties
Faculty of Education
Faculty of Dentistry
Faculty of Engineering 
Faculty of Science
Faculty of Law
Faculty of Medicine
Faculty of Arts and Social Sciences
Faculty of Business and Economics
Faculty of Language and Linguistics
Faculty of Built Environment
Faculty of Computer Science and Information Technology (FCSIT) 
Faculty of Pharmacy 
Faculty of Creative Arts (formerly Cultural Centre)
Faculty of Sports and Exercise Science (formerly Sports & Exercise Science Centre)
Academies
Academy of Islamic Studies
Academy of Malay Studies

Institutes
Institute for Advances Studies
Asia-Europe Institute
Institute of China Studies
Institute of Educational Leadership
International Institute of Public Policy & Management (INPUMA)
Institute of Ocean and Earth Sciences (IOES)
Institute of Research Management and Monitoring
Centres
Centre for Foundation Studies
Centre for Civilisational Dialogue
Centre for Continuing Education (UMCCed)
Centre of Democracy and Election Studies (UMcedel)
Centre of Excellence (UMCoE)
Centre of Addiction Sciences (UMCAS)
Academic Enhancement & Leadership Development Centre
Maritime Research Centre (UMMReC) 
Centre for Innovation & Enterprise (UMCIE)
Centre for Initiation of Talent and Industrial Training (CITra)
Centre for Research in Biotechnology for Agriculture (CEBAR) 
Halal Research Centre
Community Engagement Centre (UMCares)
Tropical Infectious Diseases Research & Education Centre (TIDREC)

Vice-chancellors

Partner institutions

 Australia
Australian National University
University of Adelaide
University of Melbourne
University of Sydney
University of New South Wales
University of Western Australia
Monash University
 Belgium
KU Leuven
University of Antwerp
 Canada
McGill University
University of Ottawa
University of Waterloo
York University
 France
École Polytechnique
University of Paris-Sud
University of Rennes 2
Sciences Po
 Ireland
University College Dublin
University of Limerick

 Japan
Kyoto University
Osaka University
Waseda University
Nara Institute of Science and Technology
 Malaysia
Universiti Tunku Abdul Rahman
Universiti Malaysia Sarawak
National University of Malaysia
 Russia
Higher School of Economics
Institute of Oriental Studies of the Russian Academy of Sciences
Moscow State University, Faculty of Soil Sciences
 South Korea
University of Seoul
Seoul National University
Busan University of Foreign Studies
 United Kingdom
University of Birmingham
University of Cambridge
University of Edinburgh
University of Glasgow
University of Leeds
University of Liverpool
University of Nottingham
University of Wales
King's College London
Queen's University Belfast
 United States
University of Florida
University of Michigan
Johns Hopkins University
Yale University

Notable alumni

Throughout the years, UM has produced many alumni that have contributed significantly towards the development of Malaysia, and its graduates have been notable in various fields within the country. In politics, out of ten Malaysian prime ministers, five of them attended UM, with Mahathir Mohamad becoming the only prime minister to be elected twice. Numerous University of Malaya graduates have been elected as members of parliament to the Dewan Rakyat, senators to the Dewan Negara, members of the State Legislative Assembly, as well as being ministers of the federal cabinet, chief ministers, governors, and speakers to both houses of representatives. Notable politicians include current Speaker of the Dewan Rakyat Johari Abdul, former President of the Dewan Negara Vigneswaran Sanasee, former Minister of Finance Daim Zainuddin who finished his doctoral thesis at UM, former Yang di-Pertua Negeri of Malacca and Menteri Besar of Pahang Mohd Khalil Yaakob, and Member of Parliament for Sungai Buloh and Rhodes Scholar Sivarasa Rasiah.

UM has also produced a large number of lawyers, diplomats and public servants that have hold top posts within their respective fields. In diplomacy and foreign affairs, 51st President of the United Nations General Assembly Razali Ismail, and 8th Secretary General of the ASEAN Ajit Singh, both studied at UM for their undergraduate degrees. More than half of the Chief Secretary to the Government of Malaysia has been a graduate from UM where out of fifteen of them, eight has studied at UM, in where Ismail Bakar is the most recent alumnus to hold the post. Two former Inspector-General of Police (Malaysia) Norian Mai and Mohamad Fuzi Harun also attended UM. In law, two Chief Justice of Malaysia, three President of the Court of Appeal of Malaysia, two Attorney General of Malaysia, three Chief Judge of Malaya and one Chief Judge of Sabah and Sarawak have all attended UM Law School.

Three past governors of the Malaysian central bank, Bank Negara Malaysia, Ali Abul Hassan bin Sulaiman, Zeti Akhtar Aziz and Muhammad bin Ibrahim, all studied commerce at UM. Business people include billionaires such as the founder and chairman of Top Glove Corporation Bhd, Lim Wee-Chai, CEO of Westports Holdings G. Gnanalingam, founder and chairman of Public Bank Berhad Teh Hong Piow and founder of NagaCorp Ltd Chen Lip Keong.

In literature and the arts, five Malaysian National Laureates have studied in UM which include writer and Tokoh Akademi Negara Muhammad Haji Salleh, novelists Anwar Ridhwan and Siti Zainon Ismail, writer Baha Zain and the first female recipient of the award, Zurinah Hassan. Moreover, various UM alumnus have won the Southeast Asian Writers Award, including novelists such as Malim Ghozali PK and author Rex Shelley. Notable early Malaysian feminist authors such as Anis Sabirin and Adibah Amin are also associated with the university.

Student life

Student bodies
The University of Malaya's campus student bodies, known as University of Malaya Students' Union (UMSU) are elected by the students to have representatives engaging in policies and matters relating to student affairs. As such the elections, known as 'PRKUM' which is acronym for Pilihanraya Kampus Universiti Malaya in Malay language is seen as a precursor to a student leader. Whilst prior elections before 2019 was organised by the Student Affairs Department of the university, the first election managed by the students was conducted on 4 March 2019, marking a historic first whereby an all student affair made the elections a milestone. Suara Siswa, a pro-student group won the elections which saw 61% of 13,671 students cast their votes.

Sports
Badminton is generally popular in Malaysia. In UM, such facilities are managed by the Sports Centre. Badminton and tennis courts are regularly used, while the swimming pool available is Olympic-sized. Outdoor gymnasiums are also scattered around the campus, such as near UM Varsity Green Football Field and First Residential College. Kayaking is also popular among students.

Facilities

The university houses 13 residential colleges (11 in-campus, 2 off-campus), an Olympic-sized swimming pool, the Rimba Ilmu Botanical Gardens, the UM Arena which boasts a full course running track, several museums of different fields as well as numerous sports facilities (gymnasiums, courts and fields) in the campus. The university's teaching hospital, University of Malaya Medical Centre (UMMC)  is located at the boundaries of UM near the Petaling Jaya gate.

Residential Colleges 
Unlike other global universities, colleges in University of Malaya do not function as accommodation and institution. They are only hostels for students.

During the pandemic, all colleges were at limited capacity or closed. In September 2021, they were in the process of being reopened in conjunction with the loosening of pandemic measures by the government. Many colleges have their own basic facilities, such as a restaurant. In the 12th college (UM labels their residential colleges by name and dedicated number) lies a well known hipster cafe called He and She Coffee.

 Tuanku Abdul Rahman Residential College
 Tuanku Bahiyah Residential College (Engineering Hostel)
 Tuanku Kurshiah Residential College
 Bestari Residential College
 Dayasari Residential College
 Ibnu Sina Residential College (Clinical Students Hostel)
 Za'ba Residential College
 Kinabalu Residential College
 Tun Syed Zahiruddin Residential College (off-campus limits)
 Tun Ahmad Zaidi Residential College
 Ungku Aziz Residential College
 Raja Dr. Nazrin Shah Residential College
 13th Residential College (formerly International Islamic University of Malaysia Petaling Jaya foundation campus)

Dewan Tunku Canselor (Tunku Chancellor Hall)
The Dewan Tunku Canselor, also popularly known as DTC, is one of the 47 buildings listed under the National Heritage list, as well as a UNESCO Heritage Building. The building was named and officiated by the first prime minister of Malaysia, Tunku Abdul Rahman on 25 June 1966 where he became the university's chancellor at that time. It was designed by Dato' Kington Loo/CHR Bailey, an architect from the firm BEP Arkitek.

Panggung Eksperimen (Experimental Theatre)

University of Malaya Medical Centre (UMMC)
The UMMC formerly known as University Hospital, is a government-funded medical institution located in Pantai Dalam, southwest corner of Kuala Lumpur, Malaysia. It was established by Statute in September 1962 and is part of University of Malaya.

Rimba Ilmu Botanical Gardens

Museums and galleries 

 Museum of Asian Art 
 Museum of Zoology @ Institute of Biological Sciences, Faculty of Science
 Museum of Geology
 Malay Studies Museum @ Academy of Malay Studies
 Malaya Art Gallery @ Chancellery Building

Libraries

Central Library 
 Main Library

Branch libraries 

 T.J. Danaraj Medical Library 
 Ahmad Ibrahim Law Library 
 Za'ba Memorial Library

Special libraries 

 Dental Library
 Built Environment Library 
 East Asian Studies Library 
 Education Library
 Engineering Library
 Indian Studies Library 
 Islamic Studies Library 
 Languages and Linguistics Library 
 Malay Studies Library

In the media
The University of Malaya became a subject matter in the 1987 documentary film, Dari Desa Ke Kampus (lit. From the Countryside to the Campus), produced by Filem Negara Malaysia.

See also

University of Malaya Medical Centre
University of Malaya Specialist Centre
 Faculty of Medicine, University of Malaya
Centre for Foundation Studies (University of Malaya)
University of Malaya Botanical Gardens Rimba Ilmu
National University of Singapore

References

Citations

Sources 

 https://www.usnews.com/education/best-global-universities/rankings

External links

 Official website.
 Coats of arms of the National University of Singapore and its predecessors

 
Universities and colleges in Kuala Lumpur
Public universities in Malaysia
ASEAN University Network
Educational institutions established in 1905
Educational institutions established in 1949
Law schools in Malaysia
Business schools in Malaysia
Engineering universities and colleges in Malaysia
Information technology schools in Malaysia
Medical schools in Malaysia
Nursing schools in Malaysia
1905 establishments in British Malaya
1949 establishments in Malaya
Winners of the Nikkei Asia Prize
Educational institutions in Malaysia